The RFU Championship is an English rugby union competition comprising twelve clubs. It is the second level of men's English rugby and is played by both professional and semi-professional players. The competition has existed since 1987, when English clubs were first organised into leagues.

Organisation and format
The Championship is governed by the Rugby Football Union (RFU). The current competition format is a double round-robin tournament, where teams play each other home and away. The 2021-22 season had no playoff phase, and no team was promoted to the Premiership as no team met the minimum standards criteria.

Current teams

Current league table

History

Precursor competitions (1987–2009)
The governing body for rugby union in England, the RFU, first allowed league hierarchies in 1987. This came nearly a century after leagues were first established in football and cricket, England's other two principal team sports.

The RFU's reluctance to allow leagues was based on a perceived threat to the sport's amateurism regulations: competitive leagues were seen as making clubs more likely to use incentives to attract and retain the best players.

When formalised leagues were finally permitted in the 1987-88 season, the second level was known as 'Courage League National Division Two'. The league has since had several different names before becoming the RFU Championship in the 2009-10 season.

Origins (2008)
In November 2008, the Rugby Football Union (RFU) published a plan for a new professional tier below the Premiership. The 12-team Championship replaced the 16-team National Division One.

To enable Level 2 to transition from 16 teams to 12, the RFU proposal called for five teams to be relegated at the end of the 2008–09 season. The relegated teams would play in the third level of rugby, known as 'National Division 2' in 2008–09 and to be known as 'National League 1' in 2009–10.

Additionally, one team would be relegated from the Premiership (Level 1 to Level 2), one team would be promoted to the Premiership (Level 2 to Level 1), and one team would be promoted from National Division 2 (Level 3 to Level 2).

The RFU Council voted overwhelmingly in favour of the new proposal, and the first Championship season started the following year, in 2009.

RFU Championship (2009–present)

Promotion to the Premiership

Automatic promotion to the Premiership has not been a consistent feature of the RFU Championship. A playoff tournament was used to decide promotion between the 2009–10 and 2016–17 seasons, as well as in the 2020–21 season.

In seasons without a promotion playoff (2017–18, 2018–19, 2019–20), the team at the top of the league was automatically promoted to the Premiership.

The RFU plans to reintroduce possible promotion at the end of the 2023–24 season, by means of a play-off between the top placed team in the Championship and the bottom placed side in the Premiership.

COVID-19
The COVID-19 pandemic caused the 2019–20 season to be prematurely ended. Final standings were based on a "best playing record formula" and promotion and relegation remained for the 1st and 12th placed clubs respectively.

The 2020–21 season was impacted by the above mentioned pandemic and as a consequence a shorter season kicked off in spring 2021. The reduced season saw each team play each other once only with the top two teams entering a two-legged promotion playoff. There was no relegation due to cancellation of National League 1.

In February 2021 a moratorium on relegation from the Premiership into the Championship was approved and it was confirmed that the RFU were working on a review of the minimum standards criteria for promotion and the league structure from 2021–22. The moratorium was extended for a further two years in June 2021 and also could include promotion from the Championship at the end of the 2022–23 season if there was promotion in the previous season. There was also no relegation from the Championship in 2021–22.

Competition funding
The RFU Championship clubs were in dispute with the RFU over funding for the competition and claimed that each club was owed £77,000 for the past three seasons, and will be owed a further £120,000 over the next four seasons. The clubs believed they should have received £295,000 in 2009–10, rising to £400,000 by 2015–16 and further believe there was a breach of contract on the part of the RFU. The RFU stated that the original funding was an estimate and by 2015–16 the figure will be £359,400. When the RFU announced the hiatus of promotion play-offs, it also announced funding increases from both itself and the Premiership, including a new system which ties some of the new funding to each Championship side's performance in the league season. The extra funding provided prior to 2016–17 was removed prior to the 2020–21 season.

Sponsorship
For sponsorship reasons, the competition was officially known as the Greene King IPA Championship between the 2013–14 and 2020–21 seasons.

Historic results

Courage League National Division Two (1987–1997)
1980s

1990s

Allied Dunbar Premiership Two (1997–2000)
1990s

National Division One (2000–2009)
2000s

RFU Championship (2009–)
2000s

2010s

2020s

See also
 Rugby union in England
 Premiership Rugby
 List of English rugby union teams

Notes

References

External links
 Official site
 RFU
 BBC Sport

 
2
Rugby Union
Recurring sporting events established in 1987
Sports leagues established in 1987
1987 establishments in England
England
Professional sports leagues in the United Kingdom